Christopher Christoph Nyenga (born April 10, 1993), known professionally as Christoph the Change, is a Liberian rapper and songwriter. After releasing the hip-hop track "Take a Break", he was criticized for sounding "too American". He gained mainstream success in Liberia after releasing the Hipco songs "Papay God", "Heaven and Hell", and "Gbanna Man".

Early life 
Christoph the Change was born on April 10, 1993, in Monrovia, Liberia. He attended St. Matthew United Methodist High School. Though apparently living a "lavish lifestyle", he was evicted in 2019 from a rental property for not paying the rent on time.

Discography

Singles
"DJ SK" (featuring Christoph Ejoke) (2016)
"Hold Your Polaruh" (featuring Margas) (2016)
"Marry Me" (featuring Yung Muse Nest Json) (2016)
"BYC Anthem" (featuring Quincy B) (2015)
"Hipco 101 - 105" (2017)
"Handbag" (2017)
"Politics" (2017)
"What Y'all Want" (2017)
"Hipco and Trapco"
"Turn Up"
"Eggs are cook from the Edges"
"Woomi"
"Senior Player"
"Rack 8 Shake 8"
"Bad Girl" (featuring Revoluxon and T Floyd)
"Clap for Jesus" (2019)
"Landlord Daughter" (2020)

Awards and Nominations

See also
List of Liberian musicians

References

Liberian songwriters
Musicians from Monrovia
1993 births
Living people